A timeline of the Yemeni Revolution spans the following four articles related to the Yemeni Revolution:

Timeline of the Yemeni Revolution (January – 2 June 2011), a chronology from the start of protests in mid-January 2011 to 2 June 2011, the eve of a pivotal bombing
Timeline of the Yemeni Revolution (3 June – 22 September 2011), a chronology from the bombing of the presidential compound on 3 June 2011 to 22 September 2011, the last day of vice-presidential rule
Timeline of the Yemeni Revolution (23 September – December 2011), a chronology from the president's return on 23 September 2011 to the end of December 2011
Timeline of the Yemeni Revolution (January – 27 February 2012), a chronology from the start of 2012 to the inauguration of a new president on 27 February 2012

See also
Timeline of the Arab Spring

Yemeni Revolution
Yemen